Naruto: Rise of a Ninja is a fighting role-playing video game for the Xbox 360, developed by Ubisoft Montreal, making it the first Naruto game to be developed by a non-Japanese company. The game is specifically based on the English dubbed version of the anime. The game was released in 2007.  A sequel titled Naruto: The Broken Bond was released in the following year.

Gameplay
Naruto: Rise of a Ninja consists of two major gameplay modes: one-on-one fighting mode and a role-playing mode, where Konoha serves as a main hub to access various missions players can go on. The main story mode alternates between these two modes and takes place from the beginning of the series to the end of the Invasion of Konoha arc (episodes 1-80 of the anime), with included sidequests. It features gameplay similar to that of a 3D platformer, like jumping acrobatically from rooftop to rooftop or racing through checkpoints, as well as having one-on-one brawls much like the Naruto: Clash of Ninja series. Like with most Naruto games, it features cel-shaded graphics. The game allows online versus multiplayer via Xbox Live, titled "The Forest of Death". By defeating other opponents, players rank up and eventually gain points to complete the exam. If the player is defeated, they must begin from the bottom of the table all over again, but the points are still kept. Offline play and two-player versus mode are also available.

The game supports downloadable content; five new characters have been made available (Shikamaru, Choji, Jiraiya, the 3rd Hokage, and Temari). Downloadable content also adds two new arenas to play in and additional achievements for each character played in the Forest of Death.

Characters
Naruto Uzumaki
Sasuke Uchiha
Sakura Haruno
Kakashi Hatake
Gaara of the Sand
Haku
Zabuza Momochi
Orochimaru
Kiba Inuzuka
Rock Lee
Neji Hyuga

Downloadable characters
Choji Akimichi
Temari
Shikamaru Nara
The Third Hokage
Jiraiya

Choji, Temari, the Third Hokage and Jiraiya came bundled in packs of two: Choji and Temari, Third Hokage and Jiraiya. Each bundle also came with two new maps/arenas. Shikamaru is free, but players must be registered to Ubisoft and link their Xbox Live to their Ubisoft account. 
The DLC is no longer available on the Xbox Marketplace.

Development
Rise of a Ninja was released in 2007. Ubisoft has also released a free 60MB download, which includes a Japanese voice option, the ability to change the in-game voices to Japanese, while still keeping the English subtitles.

Reception 

The game received "favorable" reviews according to video game review aggregator Metacritic.

Naruto: Rise of a Ninja was nominated for Best Game Based on a Movie Or TV Show at 2007 Spike Video Game Awards, but lost to The Simpsons Game.

References

External links
 Official website
 

2007 video games
Rise of a Ninja
Xbox 360-only games
Ubisoft games
Open-world video games
Video games scored by Inon Zur
Video games developed in Canada
Video games with cel-shaded animation
Jade (game engine) games
Xbox 360 games